Safe household water storage is a critical component of a Household Water Treatment and Safe Storage (HWTS) system being promoted by the World Health Organization (WHO) worldwide in areas that do not have piped drinking water. In these areas it is not uncommon for drinking water to be stored in a pot, jar, crock or other container in the home. Even if this drinking water was of acceptable microbiological quality initially, it can become contaminated from dirty hands and utensils, such as dirty dippers and cups. Drinking water containers with "narrow dispensers are key" to keeping water from being contaminated while being stored in the home.

All types of 'safe household water storage must be used with water from known clean sources or with water having received prior efficacious treatment.

Examples of containers
Solar Cookers International (SCI) has incorporated the Safe Household Water Storage container in their water pasteurization programs in Kenya.  They are part of a safe water package  that consists of a CooKit solar cooker, a black pot, a Water Pasteurization Indicator (WAPI), and a Safe Household Water Storage container.   The containers are handmade out of clay by local artisans. Their design incorporates a small opening at the top to help prevent children from dipping cups and possibly dirty hands into the drinking water. There is a spigot at the bottom.  "Unfortunately, the spigot is almost as expensive as the container itself." In total each cost about KSh.450/= or about US$6.00. The unglazed clay container helps to keep the water naturally somewhat cool in dry climates because a very small amount of the water is absorbed by the container and then evaporates.

Background
The  United Nations' Millennium Declaration adopted by its General Assembly in September 2000 set Millennium Development Goals (MDG) that have a purpose of significantly reducing the proportion of people in the world in extreme poverty. Resolution 19 specifically states with respect to drinking water, "To halve, by the year 2015...the proportion of the world's people who are unable to reach or to afford safe drinking water".  In 2009 the United Nations published The Millennium Development Goals Report that states: "The world is well on its way to meeting the drinking water target, though some countries still face enormous challenges."
One way that the World Health Organization (WHO) has supported the safe drinking water goal is with its Household Water Treatment and Safe Storage (HWTS) program which targets people that are not connected to community water systems. Their website states that improved HWTS techniques can dramatically improve drinking water quality and reduce diarrhoeal diseases for those that must rely on unsafe water supplies.  It reminds us that there are 1.6 million diarrhoeal deaths per year related to unsafe water, sanitation, and hygiene and that these are mostly of children under 5 years old.

See also
Point-of-use water treatment which discuss a variety of water treatment methods which may be used by households to improve water quality. 
Self-supply of water and sanitation
UN-Water is a mechanism of the United Nations with a purpose of supporting water-related efforts.

References

External links
World Health Organization (WHO): Household Water Treatment and Safe Storage (HWTS) program. 
Plasticology 101 (CPS) Clear real world explanations about household water storage.
WHO/SDE/WSH/02.07 report:  Managing water in the home: accelerated health gains from improved water supply  prepared by Professor Mark D. Sobsey, School of Public Health, University of North Carolina, Chapel Hill, North Carolina, USA, report covers many aspects of a HWTS system including storage, treatment, social/economic aspects, and monitoring.
Portion of above report most pertinent to this article is Chapter 4:  Storage and treatment of household water.
WHO: Other related drinking water quality programs.

World Health Organization
United Nations Development Programme
Appropriate technology
Water treatment
Water supply infrastructure
Drinking water
Containers